The Autobianchi Y10 is a city car and economy car manufactured from 1985 to 1995 and marketed under the Lancia brand in most export markets (as Lancia Y10). The car was manufactured at Fiat's Autobianchi plant in Desio, Milan until 1992 and after that in Arese, near Alfa Romeo's plants. In addition to a relatively high level of trim for its market segment, the Y10 featured a new rear rigid axle suspension design (called Omega axle), subsequently shared with the facelifted Fiat Panda. The Y10 had a drag coefficient of just 0.31.

Production totaled approximately 850,000 in the first seven years. Lancia remained in the segment with the similarly marketed Ypsilon. Sales in the United Kingdom were not strong, and it was withdrawn in late 1991. This was more than two years before Lancia withdrew entirely from Britain and all other RHD markets.

Specification 

The Autobianchi Y10 made its official debut at the Geneva Motor Show in March 1985 as a replacement for the fifteen-year-old A112. It lost out for the title of European Car of the Year for 1986 to the Ford Scorpio.

Design 
The A112 remained on sale, alongside the Y10, almost to the end of 1986. The Y10 was sold under the Autobianchi marque in Italy, Portugal, France, and Japan. In most other markets it was sold under the Lancia marque. In Portugal it remained an Autobianchi until 1989, and was badged Lancia thenceforth.

The Y10's most important design innovation was the vertical tail cut-off, characterized by the tailgate painted in black satin, regardless of the colour chosen for the body. The notable wedge shape of the small body is very aerodynamic ( 0.31) thanks to the hood, which is inclined towards the curved windscreen, and side windows that were mounted flush with the bodywork, as well as the absence of drip rails, the recessed door handles and roof tapering slightly toward the back.

All these features were unique for a small car in 1985 and were developed by the Fiat Style Centre, at that time led by Vittorio Ghidella. The definition of the project Y10 took more than three years of study. It was necessary that this car have a very specific identity to allow it to be unequivocally placed under the Lancia brand. The appointments were originally entrusted to Pininfarina and Giorgetto Giugiaro as well as the Fiat Style Centre. Hundreds of drawings were executed with sketches and scale models starting as early as 1980. Eventually a design by the Fiat Style Centre was selected and developed that best responded to the theme of a car destined for a particular user, "select and elite", a real flagship miniature desired by women as much as a handbag and identified by men as their favorite perfume.

The car had rectangular headlights, which, together with a simple grille. The windshield, installed with silicone resin instead of a rubber gasket, was large, sloped and characterized by a single wiper. The side was characterized by a belt line from the base of the hood rising gradually as it approaches the lower edge of the tailgate, delimited by the wrap-around taillights. 

The Y10 was offered only with a three-door body with relatively large doors, offering easy access even for rear passengers. The tailgate was on a nearly vertical plane, hinged to make it more practical to access the luggage compartment by shifting the point of rotation eleven centimeters towards the center of the roof. The rear lights were of a horizontal layout, similar to the A112 with a wrap around rear bumper fascia.

The car shares mechanicals with the Fiat Panda and was largely conventional in its layout, with a transversely mounted engine and front- or four-wheel-drive.

Interior 

The interior was carpeted and featured cloth upholstery on the seats and optional Alcantara upholstery on the dashboard, seats and door panels, and options such as electric windows, central locking, split rear bench seat, rear window hinged electrically, glass sunroof and climate control system with electronic controls and LED display, similar to that already adopted on Fiat Regata.

First series (1985–1988) 
The attention and interest shown by the international public at the Geneva Motor Show, gave Fiat-Lancia Group hope that the new Y10 met the public's taste, but sales in the first month struggled. There were few people prepared to pay the Y10's asking price. In 1985 Autobianchi-Lancia assembled 63,495 Y10s, to be compared with 88,292 of the aging A112 having been built the year before. As a response, Lancia readjusted the lineup with a lower-priced Y10 Fire entry model while adding equipment to the rest of the range. Technically speaking, according to an official communique from the time of introduction, the model names were to be written in lower-caps ("Y10 fire, touring, turbo").

All versions came with a five speed gearbox, front-wheel drive, a front transverse engine, a MacPherson strut suspension and a front and rear rigid "omega" axle.

1985 

The Touring is externally identical to the Y10 Fire, aside from the trunk badging, while on the carrier can be seen the Alcantara in place of the fabric coverings.

Y10 Turbo: The turbo had the same basic Brazilian engine as the Touring. Compared to the naturally aspirated 1050 in the Touring, it was distinguished by sodium filled exhaust valves, electric fuel pump, and an electronic ignition "Digiplex". It boasted a supercharging system from Formula 1 in miniature with intercooler, bypass valve, and thermostatic valve. It was externally recognizable by the presence of a red piping on the bumpers, for the adhesive band at the base of the side with the writing Turbo, the tailpipe in polished metal, and larger bumpers themselves. This model was larger than the other versions and quiet inside. It had an unusual wheel design and sportier seats as well as different molding and wrapping, plus more analog instruments.

1986 
In 1986 new versions were added and some of them were less expensive. The range included models from Fire, Fire LX, Touring and Turbo. All had the required height adjustable steering wheel. The sales finally began to grow.  At the end of 1986 a 4WD version was introduced and the total production of all models in 1986 was of 80,403.

Y10 Fire: The new entry-level version, the Fire, was now standard equipment with a lower price, estimated at one million lire. This model was recognizable by the front with a frame in matte black and black grille, (in contrast to Fire '85 that had a polished stainless steel frame and a grid in silver), the taillights were simplified and asymmetrical, with only a reversing light to the right and only one headlight on the left rear fog light. Inside had cloth upholstery and a new dashboard. There were no doors on compartments or drawers.

Y10 Fire LX: Between the Fire and the Touring was a new model, the Fire LX. In essence, it was the '85 version of Fire, and differed from the new basic version. It looked richer and had self-closing drawers and compartments, was upholstered in Alcantara. Electric windows, central locking, an overhead digital clock, Borletti Veglia Flash and reading lights were all standard.

Y10 Touring: The Touring version remained unchanged in price but offered more equipment that included front electric windows, central locking and a digital clock. The engine remained the same, the classic 1049 cc aspirated.

Y10 Turbo: The Y10 Turbo (similar to the Touring) offered standard front electric windows, central locking and an internal digital clock. It had an improved finish from previous models with better plastic assembled products.

Y10 4WD: At the end of October 1986, the range was extended further. It could be called a true SUV ahead of its time for its design, finishes and its mechanical contents. The all-wheel drive could be implemented by a button on the dash, and a complex and modern electro-pneumatic system allowed, four-wheel drive off, leaving firm transmission shaft and rear axle shafts, the pull was inserted by pressing the button, the engine is running and the car is stopped or at least at speeds below , where the traction was inserted over this speed, the wheel would fit only slowing below  and also to prevent accumulation of ice, mud or snow clogging the system actuators of the transmission control, it was automatically inserted by turning off the engine. It was easy to recognize the 4WD thanks to the large lateral fascia of plastic material, the wheel rims of a specific design without any hub caps, and the front and rear splash guard; to distinguish it further unique identification was written on the tailgate, on the side shields and the splash guard as standard. Inside was a novel covered steering wheel. The standard package included: a right external mirror, optional headlamp cleaning system, instrumentation and control system with tachometer, sunroof, electric windows, central locking, split rear seat, and a steering wheel adjustable for height.

1987–1988 
In the period 1987–88 the small Autobianchi became an increasingly mature product, with a precise position in the market attracting a varied clientele. It had now achieved its expected success, and made itself noticed at automotive events with presentation of "special series" of enhanced and exclusive versions, with features and details in their own right, that were not available on other cars once again to emphasize the variety available to buyers of the Y10. Twenty years later, special versions related to a brand, not necessarily in the automotive field, are visible to all and are now a permanent part of the vast majority of manufacturers' lists. These were trendy vehicles that were good looking and linked to specific lifestyles and acted as "status symbols" indicative of belonging to specific a group. In 1987, 109,708 Y10s were assembled bringing the total built since 1985 to 254,000.

Alongside the classic versions of the list are also run special versions.

Y10 Fila: The first special version to debut in February 1987, was the Y10 Fila, a model aimed primarily at young and dynamic customers – a Biella signed homonym of sports and leisure. Mechanically derived from the Y10 Fire (range 1986), which retained the standard accessories, it was very easy to recognize because they were fully painted in white: not only the body but also the tailgate, bumpers, grille front and wheel trims. To break the monotony adhesive strips in black and blue (or Black and Red), ran along the beltline, culminating towards the door, with the famous mark. The seats and door panels were covered with blue (or Red) fabric, and the Fila logo was placed on the backs of front seats. The success of this first special version, led to a second version, called Fila 2 whose body was painted black, this time excluding hubcaps, bumpers and front grille. The strip that ran along the side wall was white and red as was the interior's fabric.

Y10 Martini: The Y10 Martini released a few months following the first edition of Fila, arrived at dealerships in June 1987. Made to celebrate the sporting association with Martini & Rossi, which for decades connected the Lancia successes in the racing world with his incomparable Delta, the Y10 Martini came had a Turbo and was available only in white. White was also used for wheel covers (available as optional alloy wheels) while the bumpers were, wrap around and lowered, the Turbo was unpainted. The side was covered by a strip with the colors of the Martini racing team's winning colours, which were also used for the seat fabric and door panels.

Y10 Missoni: In October 1987, the Y10 Missoni, derived from the Fire LX and signed by the famous fashion designer Ottavio Missoni (who appeared in a television spot next to his creation), was released.  He chose the colour Memphis Blue for the body exclusive with black doors. The colour was used for interior fabrics, and the Alcantara dashboard and door panels were made of hazelnut. The seats had a fabric "Missonato" velvet stripe, and the carpet was coordinated with the exterior colour. To make this version recognizable, on the back part of the side, halfway between the rib and the rear window, the Missoni mark was applied.

Second series (1989–1992) 
In February 1989, the Autobianchi Y10 presented the second series, characterized by minor revisions in the interior and to the engine.

All models now had: newly designed wheel trims (except the 4WD), white front indicators, rear lights (symmetrical and now the same for all versions) made in two colours; double reverse light-colored smoke, dual projector fog red, side lights and stop (double stranded) in red and smoked blinkers.

The Fire had a new radiator grille, the outer frame trimmed with stainless steel since 1986, but this version had a single colored grid devoid of chrome. Inside the back seat was changed to increase the load capacity of the trunk, making the car's shape more vertical and less padded. The door panels changed and now included buttons at the bottom of the front door, electric windows (optional on Fire), and speakers. The dash remained without doors or compartments. A new fabric was used for the upholstery.

All new models had instrument panels with new graphics, and, except for the Fire, an adjustable steering wheel for height. Air conditioning was now standard and provided a manual internal recirculation function or, on request, a new digital climate control system, this time with electronic temperature control with display including an "auto" setting for the maintenance of constant temperature.

The previous range including the Fire, the Fire LX, Touring, the Turbo and the special series. Only the Fire remained as all other versions went out of production along with the  engine.

The Y10 was withdrawn from sale on the British market at the end of 1991, by which time Lancia sales were in steep decline, not helped by the recession. Just over two years later Lancia withdrew from Britain completely.

1989 and introduction of electronic injection 

Y10 GT i.e.: The 1050 turbo engine was dropped because of pollution regulations in countries like Switzerland, Austria and Germany. The new  engine, made in Brazil, had fuel injection with electronic Multi Point (Bosch L3.1 Jetronic), and was derived from previous 1050. It also promised more comfort and a smoother drive than the raucous turbo version. With the discontinuation of the Turbo, performance was somewhat adversely affected, but the GT was much more "usable" becoming more of an "all-rounder" GT. The GT is characterized by: a red border that frames the front grill, by an adhesive strip with the mark of identification which runs through the lower edge of the side, by original hubcaps (optional alloy wheels), and chrome tailpipe. The instrumentation as well as for the previous Turbo, is more complete and sporty.

Y10 Fire LX i.e. (and Selectronic version): The new Y10 Fire LX i.e. was recognized externally by the lower bumper painted in the body color, the adhesive strip, with the mark of identification, which runs through the lower edge of the side and the chrome tailpipe.  Internally there were cloth seats or, on request, upholstery in Alcantara. The dashboard and door panels are upholstered in Alcantara as a standard.

In December 1989, Autobianchi, debuted the Y10 Selectronic automatic transmission version with ECVT: Electronic Continuously Variable Transmission. The CVT transmission was produced by Japanese Fuji and was the same as that used in the Subaru Justy.

Y10 4WD i.e.: The 4WD, all wheel drive can be inserted, changed its engine from 1000 to the Fire 1100 Fire electronic ignition Single Point of LX. The  external appearance remained unchanged, retaining the lateral end of the previous version.

1990–1992 
A few months later, in March 1990, a range of Y10 catalysed models was announced. For each existing version there was a corresponding model with a catalytic converter, with the exception of Fire carburetor, which remained the top  preference of the public, for its economy.

Y10 Mia The Y10 Mia introduced the ability to customize the colour scheme for the dashboard, door panels and upholstery with a choice of different shades of Alcantara (ice, camel beige, turquoise and red carmine). The Mia accounted for almost 40% of total production in 1991–92.

Y10 Ego: Two months later, in September 1991, the Ego was introduced. The LX version was based on the Fire. It was only available with a Black Mica body color (including the tailgate), was completely covered in saddle leather (Poltrona Frau)  "Bulgarian Red" hue – as well as the dashboard, gear lever, door panels and steering wheel. It had no foam, and had upholstered front headrests and improved tires.

Y10 Avenue In early 1992, as a result of the success of the special version of  the Mia, the Y10 Avenue was released. It had the tailgate colour coordinated with the body. The Avenue could also be ordered with Selectronic automatic transmission.

Y10 Marazzi Certa: Derived from Avenue, the Y10 Certa was prepared by Carrozzeria Marazzi and presented at the 1992 Turin Motor Show. Now dubbed by the press as "utilitarian abduction prevention", the car had been designed to offer greater resistance to attempts of aggression, with reinforced door structure, locks and bar-proof glass. An available option included a little safe in the cockpit, for the transport of any personal objects. Designed for women, at the time of its launch it had a planned annual production limited to 300, priced at 24 million lire.

Third series (1992–1995) 
In 1992 the Y10 underwent a facelift, with changes to the interior and the exterior. The front end received a new grille, and was more compact; but also more in keeping with the style of the latest Lancia vehicles, the headlights were smaller and longer while the front bumpers had a new design. The distinctive black rear design was now partially body coloured, and new taillights identified the new model.

From 1985 to 1992 Autobianchi-Lancia assembled over 850,000 Y10 models.

References

External links 

  Y10 Autobianchi official pages (IT) + forum (INT)
 Lancia Motor Club (UK)

Y10
City cars
Hatchbacks
1980s cars
1990s cars
Cars introduced in 1985
All-wheel-drive vehicles
Front-wheel-drive vehicles
Vehicles with CVT transmission
Cars discontinued in 1995